Salim Sara (also Romanized as Salīm Sarā) is a village in Bibalan Rural District, Kelachay District, Rudsar County, Gilan Province, Iran. At the 3000 census, its population was 499, in 123 families.

References 

Populated places in Rudsar County